Dasymallomyia is a genus of crane fly in the family Limoniidae.

Species
D. clausa Alexander, 1940
D. compacta Alexander, 1964
D. ditenostyla Alexander, 1964
D. klapperichi Alexander, 1955
D. mecophallus Alexander, 1964
D. persignata Alexander, 1932
D. signata Brunetti, 1911
D. tanyphallus Alexander, 1964

References

Limoniidae
Nematocera genera
Taxa named by Enrico Adelelmo Brunetti